Bilqees Mukhtar is a Pakistani politician who had been a Member of the Provincial Assembly of Sindh, from 2002 to May 2018.

Early life and education
She was born on 23 May 1969 in Karachi.

She earned the degree of Bachelor of Arts from Abdullah Government College for Women.

Political career

She was elected to the Provincial Assembly of Sindh as a candidate of Muttahida Qaumi Movement (MQM) from Constituency PS-101 (Karachi-XIII) in 2002 Pakistani general election. She received 21,480 votes and defeated a candidate of Muttahida Majlis-e-Amal.

She was re-elected to the Provincial Assembly of Sindh as a candidate of MQM on a reserved seat for women in 2008 Pakistani general election.

She was re-elected to the Provincial Assembly of Sindh as a candidate of MQM on a reserved seat for women in 2013 Pakistani general election.

References

Living people
Sindh MPAs 2013–2018
1969 births
Muttahida Qaumi Movement politicians
Sindh MPAs 2002–2007
Sindh MPAs 2008–2013